Speak in Code is the fourth studio album by American alternative rock and pop punk band Eve 6, released on April 24, 2012, through Fearless Records. It was the band's first album in nine years since the release of It's All in Your Head in 2003 and is also the only album by the band that was released through Fearless Records.

This is the band's last album to feature founding drummer Tony Fagenson, who parted ways with the band in April 2018.

Background
The band signed with Fearless Records on May 3, 2011 and started planning on entering the studio that June to record their fourth album with producer Don Gilmore.

Recording
Various Evelogs were released on the band's official website through the band's recording of the album.

It was announced that Chris Lord-Alge finished the mixing of the album on September 30, 2011.

Release
On January 15, 2012, Eve 6 announced that their fourth studio album, ' Speak In Code'', would release on April 24, 2012, and that the lead single, "Victoria", would be released to rock radio on March 19, 2012.
 The songs "Lost & Found" and "Behind The Curtain" were also released ahead of the album.

Critical response

Speak in Code received a positive three-star review from USA Today saying "the sound is lean and bright" and the band shows "enduring energy."

Andrew Leahey of The Washington Times said "For those who wish Eve 6 had never lost their mojo, “Speak in Code” is a nice trip down memory lane."

Track listing

Personnel
Max Collins – bass, lead vocals
Jon Siebels – guitar, backing vocals
Tony Fagenson – drums, keyboards

Additional
 Jordan Feldstein - Management 
 The Skeletones - Horns
 Scott Harrington - Legal
 Don Gilmore - Producer, Mixer (1,5, 6, 7, 8, 9, 10, 11, 12)
 Chris Lord-Alge - Mixer (2, 3, 4)
 Chris Foitle - A&R
 Michael Farrell - Artwork
 Ken Fermaglich - Booking

Chart performance

References

2012 albums
Eve 6 albums
Fearless Records albums